Cowan, Manitoba is a town in Manitoba, Canada. It is located off the intersection of Manitoba Highways 10 and 20, 21 miles west of Camperville, and 17 miles east of Minitonas.

Climate

References 

Unincorporated communities in Parkland Region, Manitoba